Łódź University of Technology was created in 1945 and has developed into one of the biggest technical universities in Poland. Originally located in an old factory building, today covering nearly 200,000 sq. meters in over 70 separate buildings, the majority of them situated in the main University area. Almost 15,000 students are currently studying at the university. The educational and scientific tasks of the university are carried out by about 3,000 staff members.

Faculties

Faculty of Mechanical Engineering 
The Faculty of Mechanical Engineering is one of the first departments of the Lodz University of Technology conducting research activity and teaching. The Faculty offers full-time, part-time, doctoral and postgraduate studies. It educates students in seven study areas being part of technical sciences, both full-time and part-time.

Organizational units
The faculty comprises 3 institutes and 6 departments:
 Institute of Materials Science and Engineering
 Institute of Machine Tools and Production Engineering
 Institute of Turbomachinery
 Department of Vehicles and Fundamentals of Machine Design
 Department of Strength of Materials
 Department of Dynamics
 Department of Manufacturing Engineering
 Department of Automation, Biomechanics and Mechatronics
 Department of Materials Engineering and Production Systems

Fields of study
The Faculty of Mechanical Engineering offers full-time and part-time, first and second cycle studies in seven fields of study:
 Automation and Robotics
 Energy
 Mechanical Engineering
 Mechatronics
 Materials Engineering
 Production Engineering
 Transportation

The faculty also offers third cycle studies in the following fields of study:
 Construction and Operation of Machines
 Mechanics
 Materials Engineering

Faculty of Electrical, Electronic, Computer and Control Engineering 

The Faculty of Electrical, Electronic, Computer and Control Engineering is one of the largest faculties of Lodz University of Technology. It came into existence in 1945.
The faculty educates students in the fields of Automation and Robotics, Electronics and Telecommunications, Electrical Engineering,  Power Engineering, Information Technology, Occupational Safety Engineering, Biomedical Engineering, Mechatronics and Transport.

Organisational units
The faculty comprises the following units:
 Institute of Electrical Engineering Systems
 Institute of Automatic Control
 Institute of Mechatronics and Information Systems
 Institute of Electrical Power Engineering
 Institute of Electronics
 Institute of Applied Computer Science
 Department of Electrical Apparatus
 Department of Microelectronics and Computer Science
 Department of Semiconductors and Optoelectric Devices

Fields of study
The Faculty of Electrical, Electronic, Computer and Control Engineering offers full-time and part-time, first and second cycle studies in the following fields of study:
Automation and Robotics
Electronics and Telecommunications (both in Polish and English)
Electrical Engineering
Power Engineering
Information Technology (in Polish and English)
Occupational Safety Engineering
Biomedical Engineering (in Polish and English)
Mechatronics
Transport

The faculty also offers postgraduate courses and trainings for persons who want to improve their skills.

Faculty of Chemistry 

The Faculty of Chemistry is one of the faculties of Lodz University of Technology educating in the field of chemical science and technology.

Organizational units
 Institute of General and Ecological Chemistry
 Institute of Organic Chemistry
 Institute of Applied Radiation Chemistry
 Institute of Polymer and Dye Technology
 Department of Molecular Physics

Fields of study
The faculty offers the following full-time studies:
 Chemistry – 3,5-year first cycle studies, 1,5-year second cycle studies and 4-year third cycle studies 
 Chemical Technology – first, second and third cycle studies
 Environmental Protection – first cycle studies
 Nanotechnology – first and second cycle studies
 Chemistry of Building Materials (since 2011 in cooperation with AGH University of Science and Technology in Cracow and Gdańsk University of Technology)
 Chemistry and Special Purpose Material Engineering (since March 2015, interdisciplinary, the field shared with the second degree studies of the Faculty of Chemistry of Adam Mickiewicz University in Poznań and the Department of New Technologies and Chemistry at Military University of Technology in Warsaw)

Faculty of Material Technologies and Textile Design 

Organizational units
Institute of Architecture of Textiles
Department of Design Theory and Textile Design  History 
Department of Woven Fabrics
Department of Visual Arts
Department of Clothing Technology and Textronics
Department of Man-Made Fibres
Department of Knitting Technology
Department of Material and Commodity Sciences and Textile Metrology
Department of Material and Commodity Sciences and Textile Metrology
Department of Physical Chemistry of Polymers
Department of Yarn, Non-Woven Fabrics and Fibriform Composites Technology
Department of Technical Mechanics and Computer Engineering
Department of Textile Machine Mechanics

Fields of study
The faculty offers the following full-time courses in 5 fields of study:
Education of Technology and Information Engineering (1st cycle studies; 2nd cycle studies)
Material Engineering (1st cycle studies; 2nd cycle studies)
Occupational Health (1st cycle studies)
Textile Engineering (1st cycle studies; 2nd cycle studies)
Pattern Design (1st cycle studies; 2nd cycle studies)

The faculty also offers the following postgraduate courses:
Postgraduate Studies in Science of Commodities– 1 year (2 semesters)
Postgraduate Studies “Occupational Health”– 1 year (2 semesters)
Inter-faculty Postgraduate Studies in Biomaterial Engineering – 1 year (2 semesters)
Postgraduate Studies in Clothing Technology– 1,5 year (3 semesters)
Postgraduate Studies in Fashion and Design "Université de la Mode"– 2 years (4 semesters)
The Faculty provides full-time PhD courses lasting 4 years in the field of textile mechanical engineering and textile chemical engineering.

Faculty of Biotechnology and Food Sciences 

The Faculty of Biotechnology and Food Sciences is an interdisciplinary faculty where the conducted research is related to chemistry, engineering and biology. It is one of the most unusual faculties at Polish technical universities.

Organizational units
Institute of General Food Chemistry
Food and Environmental Analysis
Chemical Biophysics
Bioorganic Chemistry and Cosmetic Raw Materials
Analytical and Bioinorganic Chemistry 
Institute of Technical Biochemistry
Institute of Chemical Technology of Food
Department of Technology of Sugar Production
Department of Technology of Confectionery and Starch
Department of Technology of Food Refrigeration
Department of Food Analysis and Technology
Sugar Technology Laboratory
Quality Management 
Institute of Fermentation Technology and Microbiology
Department of Technical Microbiology
Department of Technology of Fermentation
Department of Technology of Spirit and Yeast

Fields of study
The faculty offers education in the following fields:
Biotechnology
Environmental Protection
Food Science and Nutrition 
Environmental Biotechnology

The faculty, together with IFE (International Faculty of Engineering), offers first and second cycle full-time studies in biotechnology in English.

Faculty of Civil Engineering, Architecture and Environmental Engineering 

The Faculty of Civil Engineering, Architecture and Environmental Engineering is one of the departments of Lodz University of Technology educating in the following fields: architecture and urban planning, construction, engineering and environmental protection. It was established on May 11, 1956.

Organisational units
The faculty consists of two institutes and six departments:
 Institute of Architecture and Urban Planning
 Institute of Environmental Engineering and Building Installations
 Department of Mechanics of Materials
 Department of Building Physics and Building Materials
 Department of Structural Mechanics
 Department of Concrete Structures
 Department of Geotechnics and Engineering Structures
 Department of Geodesy, Environmental Cartography and Descriptive Geometry

Fields of study
The faculty offers full-time and part-time studies in the following fields of study:
 Construction 
 Architecture and Urban Planning 
Environmental Engineering 
 Spatial Economy

The faculty also offers third cycle studies.

Faculty of Technical Physics, Information Technology and Applied Mathematics 

The Faculty of Technical Physics, Computer Science and Applied Mathematics is one of the nine of faculties of Lodz University of Technology. It was established in 1976.

Organisational units
The faculty comprises the following units:
Institute of Computer Science:
 Department of Intelligent Systems and Software Engineering
 Department of Computer Graphics and Multimedia
 Department of Systems and Information Technology
Institute of Mathematics
 Department of Mathematical Modelling
 Department of Contemporary Applied Mathematical Analysis
 Department of Insurance and Capital Markets 
Institute of Physics

Fields of study
The faculty offers full-time and part-time, first and second cycle studies in the following fields of study:
 Technical Physics
 Information Technology
 Mathematics

Faculty of Management and Production Engineering 

The Faculty of Management and Production Engineering offers education in the field of organization and management combined with technical sciences, adopting a practical approach.

Organizational units
Department of Management
Department of Production Management and Logistics
Department of European Integration and International Marketing
Department of Management Systems and Innovation
Institute of Social Sciences and Management of Technologies

Fields of study
The Faculty of Management and Production Engineering offers the following fields of study:
Management
Management Engineering
Management and Production Engineering
Business and Technology - in English and French
Occupational Safety Engineering
Logistics
Paper Production and Printing

Faculty of Process and Environmental Engineering 

The Faculty of Process and Environmental Engineering is an organizational unit of TUL conducting research and teaching.

Organizational units
 Department of Process Equipment
 Department of Chemical Engineering
 Department of Bioprocess Engineering
 Department of Process Thermodynamics
 Department of Numerical Modelling
 Department of Safety Engineering
 Department of Molecular Engineering
 Department of Environmental Engineering
 Department of Heat and Mass Transfer
 Department of Environmental Engineering Techniques

Fields of study
The faculty offers four areas of study:
 Biochemical Engineering (first cycle, full-time studies)
 Process Engineering (first and second cycle studies, full-time studies)
 Environmental Engineering (first and second cycle studies, full-time and part-time studies)
 Occupational Safety Engineering (first cycle studies, full-time and part-time studies)
 
The faculty also conducts studies of the third degree (PhD) lasting four years in full-time in the field of Chemical Engineering in Environmental Protection. Doctoral programmes prepare students to obtain a doctoral degree in the field of environmental engineering or chemical engineering.

The faculty offers the following postgraduate courses:
 Safety and Occupational Health
 Safety of Industrial Processes
 Management of Municipal Waste

International Faculty of Engineering 

International Faculty of Engineering (IFE) is an interfaculty unit offering education in foreign languages (English and French) under the auspices of TUL.

IFE students can participate in numerous courses with English as a language of instruction and 1 offered in French:
 Advanced Biobased and Bioinspired Materials (ABIOM) – in cooperation with the Faculty of Chemistry
 Biomedical Engineering and Technologies (BET) - in cooperation with the Faculty of Electrical, Electronic, Computer and Control Engineering
 Biotechnology (BIO) – in cooperation with the Faculty of Biotechnology and Food Sciences
 Business and Technology (BT) – in cooperation with the Faculty of Organization and Management
 Business Studies (BS) - in cooperation with the Faculty of Organization and Management
 Computer Science (CS) – in cooperation with the Faculty of Electrical, Electronic, Computer and Control Engineering
 Electronic and Telecommunication Engineering (ETE) – in cooperation with the Faculty of Electrical, Electronic, Computer and Control Engineering
 Gestion et Technologie (GT) - in cooperation with the Faculty of Organization and Management
 Industrial Biotechnology (IB) - in cooperation with the Faculty of Biotechnology and Food Sciences
 Information Technology (IT) – in cooperation with the Faculty of Technical Physics, Computer Science and Applied Mathematics
 Mathematical Methods in Data Analysis (MMDA) - in cooperation with the Faculty of Technical Physics, Computer Science and Applied Mathematics
 Mechanical Engineering (ME) – in cooperation with the Faculty of Mechanical Engineering
 Modelling and Data Science (MDS) - in cooperation with the Faculty of Technical Physics, Computer Science and Applied Mathematics

Foreign Language Centre

The Foreign Language Centre of Lodz University of Technology was established in 1951. Since 2005, it has been located in a former factory building on Aleja Politechniki 12 in Łódź. The building was modernized and furnished with new facilities with the aid of the European Regional Development Fund (March 2004 – January 2006). The centre has 28 classrooms, a conference room and a library, and is the seat of the University of the Third Age of Lodz University of Technology. As of 2013, the Centre employed 72 academic teachers and 15 administrative, technical and maintenance employees.

Languages taught at the Centre include English, German, Russian, Italian, French, Spanish and Polish for foreigners. In 2013, there were 6273 students learning at the centre. English courses comprised 89% of all the classes.  The centre conducts classes for first- and second-degree, as well as doctoral students in accordance with the university curriculum, for participants in Socrates-Erasmus and IAESTE programs, students of the General Secondary School of TUL, students of the University of the Third Age of TUL, foreign exchange students from Cangzhou Vocational College of Technology (China) and foreigners who want to study at TUL.

The centre is taking part in a program organized by the City of Lodz Office called “Młodzi w Łodzi – Językowzięci”, the aim of which is to promote learning languages that are less popular in Poland and to encourage students and graduates from Łódź to improve their language qualifications. As part of the program, courses of the Finnish, Danish and Swedish language are conducted at the centre. Academic teachers employed at the centre also teach at the International Faculty of Engineering. The centre is also an examination centre for the international examinations TELC, LCCI and BULATS.

Other Units 
Library of Lodz University of Technology
Institute of Papermaking and Printing  
Computer Center  
Laser Diagnostic and Therapy Center

Rectors 
 Bohdan Stefanowski (1945–1948)
 Osman Achmatowicz (1948–1952)
 Bolesław Konorski (1952–1953)
 Mieczysław Klimek (1953–1962)
 Jerzy Werner (1962–1968)
 Mieczysław Serwiński (1968–1975)
 Edward Galas (1975–1981)
 Jerzy Kroh (1981–1987)
 Czesław Strumiłło (1987–1990)
 Jan Krysiński (1990–1996)
 Józef Mayer (1996–2002)
 Jan Krysiński (2002–2008)
 Stanisław Bielecki (2008–2016)
 Sławomir Wiak (2016–2020)
 Krzysztof Jóźwik (2020–)

Notable alumni
 Karolina Bielawska (born 1999), model and beauty pageant titleholder, winner of Miss World 2021
 Andrzej Górak (born 1951), process engineer
 Dariusz Joński (born 1979), politician
 Adam Kszczot (born 1989), middle-distance runner
 Krzysztof Matyjaszewski (born 1950), Polish-American chemist, winner of Wolf Prize in Chemistry
 Hanna Zdanowska (born 1959), politician, Mayor of Łódź

References
 joint publication, ed. Ryszard Przybylski: Lodz University of Technology 1945–1995. Lodz. Published by Lodz University of Technology, 1995, p. 160-183. 

Specific

External links 

 Official website (polish version)
 Official website (english version)
 Official International Faculty of Engineering website
 The Foreign Language Centre of TUL website: http://www.cj.p.lodz.pl/index.php/en/about
 Association of Academic Foreign Languages Centres SERMO

 
1945 establishments in Poland
Educational institutions established in 1945